The Men's 77  kg weightlifting event was the fourth lightest men's event at the competition, limiting competitors to a maximum of 77 kilogrammes of body mass. The competition took place on 27 July at 19:30. The event took place at the Clyde Auditorium.

Result

References

Weightlifting at the 2014 Commonwealth Games